Robert Theodore Nelson  (born March 6, 1936) is a retired vice admiral in the United States Coast Guard who served as the 18th Vice Commandant from 1992 to 1994. He was previously Chief of Staff of the United States Coast Guard, Commanding Officer at Coast Guard Headquarters, Washington, D.C., Commander of the Second Coast Guard District, and Chief of the Office of Navigation Safety and Waterway Services at Coast Guard Headquarters. He graduated from the United States Coast Guard Academy in 1958. He also is an alumnus of George Washington University.

His awards include the Distinguished Service Medal, two Legions of Merit, the Bronze Star with Combat Device, two Meritorious Service Medals, Coast Guard Commendation and Achievement Medals with Operational Distinguishing Device. He is also authorized to wear the Cutterman's Insignia. Born in East Liverpool, Ohio in 1936, Nelson is married to Patricia Bennett, originally of Youngstown, Ohio, and has three children, two daughters and a son.

References

Living people
United States Coast Guard admirals
Vice Commandants of the United States Coast Guard
1936 births